Oxystele variegata, common name the variegated topshell, is a species of sea snail, a marine gastropod mollusk in the family Trochidae, the top snails.

Description
The size of the shell varies between 15 mm and 20 mm.

Distribution
This marine species occurs off the southern coast of South Africa, from Namibia to North Transkei.

References

 Steyn, D.G. & Lussi, M. (1998) Marine Shells of South Africa. An Illustrated Collector’s Guide to Beached Shells. Ekogilde Publishers, Hartebeespoort, South Africa, ii + 264 pp. page(s): 24
 Branch, G.M. et al. (2002). Two Oceans. 5th impression. David Philip, Cate Town & Johannesburg.
 Donald K.M., Kennedy M. & Spencer H.G. (2005) The phylogeny and taxonomy of austral monodontine topshells (Mollusca: Gastropoda: Trochidae), inferred from DNA sequences. Molecular Phylogenetics and Evolution 37: 474–483.

External links
 
 Contributions to the knowledge of South African marine Mollusca; Annals of The South African Museum vol. 47; 1963

variegata
Gastropods described in 1839